Carlton United Football Club was an Australian association football (soccer) club based in Melbourne, founded in 1908 that presumably dissolved in late 1912. The short lived club is known for its immediate success in being the first tier one state champions of Victoria, and winning the first Dockerty Cup, both in 1909. The club would also be the first in history to go back-to-back in repeating the same feat in 1910 for both the league and the cup. The club would finish second in 1911 and third in 1912 and presumably folded prior to the 1913 season. A photograph from 1909 shows the team wearing a white shirt with a blue pocket, and  blue shorts & socks.

Season by season history
The following list is the season-by-season history of the club.

Honours
Victorian First Tier
Champions (2): 1909, 1910
Runners-up (1): 1911
Dockerty Cup
Winners (2): 1909, 1910

References

Soccer clubs in Melbourne
Association football clubs established in 1908
1908 establishments in Australia
Victorian Premier League teams
1912 disestablishments in Australia
Association football clubs disestablished in 1912
Defunct soccer clubs in Australia